Lieutenant Colonel John William Balfour Paul  (4 June 1873 – 23 April 1957) was a Scottish soldier and officer of arms in the Court of the Lord Lyon.

He was the son of James Balfour Paul and brother of Arthur Forman Balfour Paul, and educated at Sedbergh School. He served in World War I, and was awarded the Distinguished Service Order in 1919.

He was Falkland Pursuivant Extraordinary from 1927 to 1939, and Marchmont Herald from 1939 to 1957. In 1951 he was appointed a Vice-Lieutenant of Midlothian, having been a Deputy Lieutenant for the county since 1931. He was made an Officer of the Order of St John the same year.

References

1873 births
1957 deaths
Companions of the Distinguished Service Order
Deputy Lieutenants of Midlothian
Officers of the Order of St John
Scottish officers of arms